James Slight (20 October 1855 – 9 December 1930) was an Australian cricketer who played in one Test match in 1880.

Slight played first-class cricket as a batsman for Victoria from 1874 to 1888, but was never able to replicate at state level his heavy scoring for South Melbourne, where his score of 279 in 1882-83 is still the club record. He toured England in 1880 with the Australian team and played in the first Test to be held in England, but his tour was marred by illness.

Slight was also a leading Australian rules footballer for South Melbourne Football Club in the Victorian Football Association (VFA) as well as a field umpire, who, in 1879, umpired the first ever interstate Australian rules match.

References

Sources
 Atkinson, G. (1982) Everything you ever wanted to know about Australian rules football but couldn't be bothered asking, The Five Mile Press: Melbourne. .

External links

1855 births
1930 deaths
Australia Test cricketers
Australian cricketers
Australian rules football umpires
Australian rules footballers from Geelong
Cricketers from Geelong
South Melbourne Football Club (VFA) players
Victoria cricketers